This is a list of video games produced for the Vectrex, a vector graphics-based video game console.
There were 28 games officially released for the console (includes built-in game) in the US.

This list also includes official unreleased games from GCE, as well as homebrew titles released between 1996 to present (games, music, demos, utility and diagnostic cartridges).

Official releases (1982-1984)

Games were released in the US by General Consumers Electronics (GCE), in Europe and Canada by Milton Bradley (MB)
and in Japan by Bandai.

Unreleased

Unreleased titles by official publishers (General Consumer Electronics (GCE), Milton Bradley (MB) and Bandai.

 Mail Plane (1983) (requires light pen). Prototype game. Introduced GCE/MB marketing literature in USA, Canada, Europe, and Japan. The prototype for the USA area map version appears to be a complete game. Also pictured in MB Finnish language marketing literature for Nordic and European areas indicated MB intended to provide a release with maps specific to Europe. In 2013 Mail Plane was recovered from a prototype cartridge by Chris Romero (a.k.a. "Vectrexer"). The recovered software was released on December 1, 2013 as binary image via made available for public download.
 Test Cart (a.k.a. Test REV. 4) (1982) The Test Cart is a test and diagnostic cartridge for the Vectrex . Various functions are supported based mainly around testing display alignment and intensity, controller functionality, and sound generation. A function to check the installed BIOS checksum is also included. The Test Cart is meant to be used along with the Vectrex Service Manual when repairing and testing the Vectrex game system. Also found later in 2000 was a single Overlay for use with the Test Cart. The Test Cart Overlay was acquire in a private sale from a former GCE employee. The Test Cart Overlay was scanned by Chris Romero (a.k.a. "Vectrexer") and made available in 2001 for public usage, and later on Spike's Big Page.
 Cube Quest (1983)
 Dark Tower
 Pitchers Duel
 Tour de France

Homebrew titles (1996 to present)

3D Lord of the Robots
3D Sector-X
3D Sector-X Hell's Fury
3D Scape
3D Scape First Edition
Alien Hunter
All Good Things
Asteroid Cowboy
Beluga Dreams 
Berzerk Debugged
Big Blue
BRECHER
Chimney Hunt
Circus Vectrex
City Bomber
Colorclash
Colorclash Limited Edition
Colorclash Slim
Continuum
Continuum The Infernal Tetramorph
Continuum The 7 Pillars of Purgatory
Continuum Time Warp
Cronotics
Crush of Lucifer
Cube Quest 
Dead of Knight
Debris Exclusive Edition
Debris Limited Edition
Debris Revisited
Debris Revisited VIP 
Everyday is Halloween
FRESSSAKK - Highscore Edition
Frontier 
Galaxy Wars/Space Launcher
Gravitrex Plus 
Hell Hole
Hex
Hexed! 
I, Cyborg
I, Cyborg: Edition X
I, Cyborg: OMEGA
Irrelevant 
Karl Quappe 
KnightEx
Logo
Mail Plane 
MENSCHENJAGD
MineX
Moon Lander 
N. E. L. S.
Nebula Commander
NOX/Death Chase 
Obsolet
Omega Chase Deluxe
Omega Chase Deluxe - Collector's Edition
Patriots
Patriots Limited Edition
Performance VX
Pitcher's Duel
Player 2
Protector LE
Protector/Y*A*S*I 
Quartz's Quest 
Revector
Release
Robot Arena
Rockaroids (limited edition)
Rockaroids Remix
Rotor
Royal 21
Royal 21 Boston
Royal 21 Christmas
Royal 21 Vegas
RushHour 
Sectis
Sectis Limited Edition
Sectis Master Edition
Shifted
Snowball
Space Frenzy
SpideX
Spike and the Angry Vortex Bird
Spike Hoppin'
Spike's Circus
Spike's Water Balloons Analog
Spin-Cart
Spinnerama
Spudster's Revenge
Star Sling LE
Star Sling Premium Limited Edition
Star Sling Turbo Edition
Star Trek Debugged
STERNENKRIEGER
Stramash Zone
Sundance
Sundance: Dark of the Sun 
Thrust
Tour de France
Trapped
Tsunami/VIX
Tsunami/VIX - Collectors Edition 
V-Frogger
V-Hockey
Vaboom!/Vectrace
VeCaves/Spike's Spree
VecMan
Vecmania

Vec Sports Boxing
Vec Sports Boxing Limited Edition
Veccy Bird
Vec Wars: Retro Devolved
Vectoblox
Vectopia
Vector 21
Vector 21: A Fistful of Wildcards!
Vector 21: OMEGA
Vector Patrol
Vector Pilot
Vector Vaders
Vectorblade
Vectrexagon
Vectrexians
Vectrexians Deluxe
Verzerk 
War of the Robots
War of the Robots: CGE2K3
War of the Robots: OMEGA
War of the Worlds
War of the Worlds Time Rift
Warrior 
Wireout
Wireout RE
Xmas Cart 2014
Xmas Cart 2014 + 2015 Double Pack
Xmas Cart 2015 
Zantis
Zantis: 99 Ways to Die
Zombie Apocalypse: USA

References

External links

 Vectrex Museum

Video game lists by platform